City on Fire is an upcoming crime drama television series for Apple TV+ created by Josh Schwartz and Stephanie Savage, based on the novel of the same name by Garth Risk Hallberg. It is scheduled to premiere on May 12, 2023.

Plot
After Samantha Cicciaro was shot in Central Park, New York City on July 4, 2003, her criminal investigation reveal to be the crucial connection between a series of mysterious city-wide fires, the downtown music scene, and a wealthy uptown real estate family fraying under the strain of the many secrets they keep.

Cast
 Wyatt Oleff as Charlie
 Chase Sui Wonders as Samantha Cicciaro
 Jemima Kirke as Regan
 Nico Tortorella as William
 Ashley Zukerman as Keith
 Xavier Clyde as Mercer
 Max Milner as Nicky Chaos
 Alexandra Doke as Sewer Girl
 Omid Abtahi as Detective Ali Parsa
 Kathleen Munroe as Detective PJ McFadden
 John Cameron Mitchell as Armory
 Alexander Pineiro as Sol
 Amel Khalil as Sherry Parsa
 Beth Malone as Felicia Gould

Episodes

Production

Development
On June 30, 2021, Josh Schwartz and Stephanie Savage was set to write and showrun the 8-episode TV series adaptation of Garth Risk Hallberg’s novel City on Fire, with Schwartz, Savage and Lis Rowinski producing the series through Fake Empire Productions and Apple TV+ is set to distribute the series. On October 29, 2021, Jesse Peretz was set to direct the first 2 episodes and will also produce the series.

Casting
On October 29, 2021, Wyatt Oleff was cast. On January 19, 2022, Chase Sui Wonders joined the cast. Additional casting was announced in March 2022.

Filming
Filming for the series began by April 2022 under the working title Brass Tactics.

References

External links
 

2020s American crime drama television series

Apple TV+ original programming
English-language television shows
Television series set in 2003
Television shows based on American novels
Television shows set in New York City
Upcoming drama television series